The National Archives of Armenia are the national archives of Armenia. The agency was officially founded in 1923. The headquarters are located in Yerevan, with regional branches in other cities.

Overview 
This non-commercial state organization carries out scientific and cultural activities under the direction of the Ministry of Territorial Administration of Armenia, which searches, registers, preserves and uses the collection of archives of Armenia in accordance with the legislation of Armenia. The National Archives also provides services in local areas, acting on behalf of the state. 

At present, there are 11 regional branches and 29 regional representations under the auspices of the Government of Armenia. As of 1 January 2013, 5,759 funds have been fully concentrated with 3,419,353 storage units. All documents stored in the archive are available to users, except documents that spread information about personal and family secrets and are not sufficiently protected.

International cooperation 
Armenia is a member of the International Council on Archives.

See also 

 Archives by country
 Armenian National Cinematheque
 List of archives
 List of national archives
 National Library of Armenia

External links
  National Archives of Armenia

Armenia
Armenian culture
Archives in Armenia